XHJR-FM is a radio station on 95.3 FM in San Jeronimito, Guerrero, Mexico, with transmitter in Zihuatanejo. It is owned by CapitalMedia and carries its Lokura FM adult hits format.

History
XEHJ-AM 1310 received its concession on January 30, 1964. It was located in Petatlán, Guerrero and owned by Jesús Orta Ramos, broadcasting with 250 watts.

The 1990s saw the first move of the station. After its 1999 transfer of control to Esperanza Zepeda Nava and María Fátima Orta Zepeda, and then its 2002 sale to Armando Puente Córdova, XEHJ became XEJR-AM 630, based in San Jeronimito with a power of 5 kW day and 2.5 kW night.

In November 2010, XEJR was cleared to move to FM as XHJR-FM 95.3. The original authorized facility broadcast with 25 kW from San Jeronimito. By this time, the station was already based in Zihuatanejo and operated by Capital Media. Capital would take possession of the concession itself in December 2018.

Like most Capital stations, XHJR adopted the new Lokura FM adult hits format in 2020.

References

Radio stations in Guerrero
Radio stations established in 1964